Mrs India or Mrs India World or Mrs. India Inc. is a National Pageant for married women to showcase their talent and represent India at Mrs. World.  Mrs India Inc is the official license holder for Mrs. World and the only pageant in India that is associated with Mrs. World. The candidates selected have an opportunity to represent India and compete in Mrs. World, The Galaxy Pageants & Mrs. Universe.

History 
Mohini Sharma won the Mrs India title in 2016, she owns the license of Mrs. India World. 

Aditi Govitrikar is an Indian actress, physician and former model. She won the Mrs. World title in 2001. An Indian actress, physician, and former fashion model. She won the Gladrags Megamodel Contest in 1996 and the Mrs. India in 2000, subsequently winning Mrs. World contest in 2001. She has acted in over 30 feature films and TV shows in several languages. Some of her numerous awards include the prestigious Rajeev Gandhi Award for National Personality of the Year, the Maharashtra Ratna Award and PETA’s Humanitarian Award.

Mrs. Rashi Jain the first winner of Mrs. India Inc. in 2019 and awarded as ‘The SwarnaKamal’ by Mrs. World in 2017. The national costume of Dr. Rashi Jain inspired by goddess Laxmi and won “The most Inspirational National Costume Award”.

Mrs. Navdeep Kaur Mrs. India World 2021 titleholder. Represented India at the Mrs. World 2022 held in Las Vegas, United States and bagged the Best National Costume Award. Navdeep Kaur aka Komal was born on 9th November, 1989 in Kansbahal, Odhisha.

Capt Chahat Dalal the runner up of Mrs. India Inc. and was applauded for her top 20 Q & A round and her top 5 Q & A. First Indian to be crowned as Mrs. Galaxy in 2022. 

Sargam Koushal (born 17 September 1990) is an Indian model and teacher who got the title of Mrs. World 2022. In 2022 Mrs. World competition, she beat 63 contestants from different countries. The competition was held in Las Vegas, Nevada. Shaylyn Ford, 2021 Mrs. World presented the crown to her. In the final competition she wore pink gown and accessories like beautiful crystal earrings.

India's International Victories 

1.	Dr. Rashi Jain – The most inspirational National Costume

2.	Mrs. Navdeep Kaur- Best National Costume | Mrs. World 2021

3.	Mrs. Manisha Rustomji – Mrs. Charity | Mrs. Universe 2021

4. Captain Chahat Dalal - Mrs Galaxy 2022

5. Mrs Sargam Koushal - Mrs. World 2022

References

External links 
 	mrsindiainc.org

Beauty pageant contestants
Recurring events
Beauty pageants in India
Indian awards